Stenocercus diploauris is a species of lizard of the Tropiduridae family. It is found in Peru.

References

Stenocercus
Reptiles described in 2020
Endemic fauna of Peru
Reptiles of Peru